Lecheng may refer to:

 Lecheng, Botswana, village of the Central District
 Lecheng, Zhaoqing, town in and subdivision of Gaoyao District, Zhaoqing, Guangdong, China
 Lecheng Subdistrict (zh), subdivision of Lechang, Guangdong, China